Brynn Adela Rumfallo is an American dancer, actress and model. She rose to fame in 2013 as a contestant on the eighth season of America's Got Talent with her dance team called “Fresh Faces”. She later garnered attention for her contemporary dance styles and winning national and regional competitions. In 2015, she first appeared on the Lifetime reality series, Dance Moms and became a permanent cast member of the elite team in 2016, before leaving in 2017 after appearing in three seasons.

Rumfallo has begun a career in modelling for brands including 'Abby Lee Apparel', 'Miss Behaved Girls', 'MissFit', 'California Kisses Dancewear' and has recently done appearances for contemporary boutique 'me.n.u'. In 2017, she released her own clothing collection, where she and her sister were the main models.

She has also appeared on the show "Dancing With The Stars" along with Maddie Ziegler and Jaycee Wilkins in 2015.

She appeared on the TV show “Boss Cheer” with her friend Sarah Reasons.

Filmography

Music videos

Commercials

Awards and nominations

References

External links 

Living people
21st-century American actresses
Actresses from Phoenix, Arizona
American child actresses
American female dancers
American female models
American film actresses
American television actresses
Dancers from Arizona
Female models from Arizona
Participants in American reality television series
Year of birth missing (living people)